The 2017 Tour Down Under was a road cycling stage race that took place between 17 and 22 January 2017 in and around Adelaide, South Australia. It was the 19th edition of the Tour Down Under and was the first event of the 2017 UCI World Tour.

 rider Richie Porte won the race for the first time, holding the race lead from the second day onwards following his stage win into Paracombe. Porte added a second stage win – the queen stage at Willunga Hill – as he ultimately won the race by 48 seconds ahead of his closest challenger. 's Esteban Chaves finished in second place, having taken third-place finishes in both of the stages won by Porte; third place on the podium was decided on the final day of the race. With McCarthy and Haas finishing tied on time, the final podium position went to McCarthy on countback.

In the race's other classifications, Chaves'  teammate Caleb Ewan won the sprints classification, winning four of the six stages during the race, becoming the third rider to do so after his compatriot Robbie McEwen in 2002 and André Greipel in 2008, while Thomas De Gendt won the mountains classification on the final day, taking points on the first climb of Montefiore Hill to assume the lead from Porte.

Participating teams
As the Tour Down Under was a UCI World Tour event, all eighteen UCI WorldTeams were invited automatically and obliged to enter a team in the race. One other team was given a wildcard entry into the race: UniSA–Australia.

Route
The route of the 2017 Tour Down Under was announced at the beginning of July 2016 and centred around the city of Adelaide in South Australia. There were six mass-start road stages and no time trials. Two days before the start of the Tour, there was a flat criterium race, the People's Choice Classic, which took place in Rymill Park and which was suited for the sprinters. It was won by Caleb Ewan in a sprint finish. The first five stages of the race itself included at least some climbing, and a few opportunities for the sprinters, especially stage one. Several stages of the Tour included climbs early in the stage and hilly circuits at the end. The second stage reversed this with circuits at the beginning and a climb immediately before the finish. The fifth stage finished with two climbs of Willunga Hill, which had been decisive in previous editions of the race. The final stage was another criterium around the centre of Adelaide.

Stages

Stage 1
17 January 2017 — Unley to Lyndoch,

Stage 2
18 January 2017 — Stirling to Paracombe,

Stage 3
19 January 2017 — Glenelg to Victor Harbor,

Stage 4
20 January 2017 — Norwood to Campbelltown,

Stage 5
21 January 2017 — McLaren Vale to Willunga Hill,

Stage 6
22 January 2017 — Adelaide,

Classification leadership table
In the 2017 Tour Down Under, four different jerseys were awarded. For the general classification, calculated by adding each cyclist's finishing times on each stage, and allowing time bonuses for the first three finishers at intermediate sprints and at the finish of mass-start stages, the leader received an ochre jersey. This classification was considered the most important of the 2017 Tour Down Under, and the winner of the classification was considered the winner of the race.

Additionally, there was a sprints classification, which awarded a red jersey. In the sprints classification, cyclists received points for finishing in the top 15 in a stage. For winning a stage, a rider earned 15 points, with one point fewer per place down to a single point for 15th place. Points towards the classification could also be accrued at intermediate sprint points during each stage; these intermediate sprints also offered bonus seconds towards the general classification. There was also a mountains classification, the leadership of which was marked by a white jersey with navy polka dots. In the mountains classification, points were won by reaching the top of a climb before other cyclists, with more points available for the higher-categorised climbs.

The fourth jersey represented the young rider classification, marked by a white jersey. This was decided in the same way as the general classification, but only riders born after 1 January 1993 were eligible to be ranked in the classification. There was also a classification for teams, in which the times of the best three cyclists per team on each stage were added together; the leading team at the end of the race was the team with the lowest total time. In addition, there was a combativity award given after each stage to the rider(s) considered, by a jury, to have "instigated the most attacks, breakaways or assisted their teammates to the best advantage".

Notes

References

External links
 

Tour Down Under
Tour Down Under
Tour Down Under
Tour Down Under